The Comet is a wooden roller coaster located at Waldameer Park in Erie, Pennsylvania, United States. It was designed by Herbert Schmeck and built by the Philadelphia Toboggan Company in 1951. It is similar to other Schmeck-designed PTC junior wooden coasters which feature a layered, figure-8/oval layout. However, the Comet is taller than the previous junior wooden coaster designs. The Comet is an ACE Coaster Classic.

Layout
The ride begins with a right turn out of the station onto a  lift hill. It then drops  and heads back up into a left turn which faces a parking lot. It drops again, into an airtime hill, and heads back up into a right turn over the station. Then it drops into a series of two bunny-hops and heads up into a right curve that is directly underneath the left curve that comes after the lift hill. It then drops and heads into a final bunny-hop before reaching the brakes, and curves right into the station.

Trains
Comet has two Junior PTC trains of four cars, all of which utilize flanged wheels. Each car has two seats that can hold two riders, for a maximum of 16 riders per train. Although the park owns two trains, for several years, only one was placed into daily operation, as park management was not comfortable running two trains with manually operated skid brakes.

Braking system
For the 2012 season, the Comet received an updated braking system from Velocity Magnetics. The new system uses a combination of magnetic and friction brakes, and along with a new control system, allows for two-train operation on busy days.

See also
Little Dipper (Six Flags Great America) (similar design)

References

Roller coasters in Pennsylvania